Sun Don't Shine is a 2012 independent thriller film written and directed by Amy Seimetz and starring Kate Lyn Sheil and Kentucker Audley. It first premiered on March 10, 2012 at the South by Southwest Film Festival, where it won a special jury award. The film was released in a limited release and through video on demand on April 26, 2013, by Factory25.

Plot
Crystal (Kate Lyn Sheil) and Leo (Kentucker Audley) are a couple on the run after Crystal murdered her husband when he accused her of cheating on him with Leo. Leo tries to help the weak and needy Crystal by taking them to St. Petersburg, Florida where they hope to ditch the body and he hopes to get help from a friend that Crystal suspects is one of his ex-girlfriends.

When they arrive Leo leaves Crystal at a campsite and goes to spend the evening with his ex. Afraid of being alone Crystal goes to the ex's house where she sees Leo kissing her and attacks them both, threatening them with a knife. Leo manages to get Crystal to drop the knife and the two leave.

Leo drops Crystal off at Weeki Wachee Springs where she watches the mermaid show. In the meantime he tries to rent a boat, however the owner of the boat rental asks him to leave after he glimpses the inside of the trunk which contains Crystal's husband.

Leo enters Weeki Wachee Springs and retrieves Crystal before returning to the boat place where they go in the water and throw in the bodies of Crystal's husband and the boat man, whom Leo also killed to protect them. Leo angrily berates Crystal who flies into a rage and hits him with an oar. Believing she has killed him she gets out of the boat and wades to the shore where she sees that local police have arrived. Crystal runs off into the swampland. Meanwhile, Leo recovers from being knocked out and returns to shore where he turns himself in.

Crystal wanders into someone's back garden. Seeing a pool she gets in and begins to swim. The owner of the property arrives and asks Crystal if she wants her to call the police. Crystal tells her "Not yet."

Cast
 Kate Lyn Sheil as Crystal
 AJ Bowen as Highway Angel
 Kentucker Audley as Leo
 Kit Gwin as Terri
 Mark Reeb as Boatman

Reception
Critical reception for Sun Don't Shine has been generally positive and the film holds a rating of 70 on Metacritic (based on 8 reviews) and 93% on Rotten Tomatoes (based on 14 reviews). The New York Times and New York Post both praised the film's acting and direction, and the reviewer for the New York Times remarked that the film "unspools like a Françoise Sagan novel: purposefully, enigmatically and with a raw emotional purity that makes its volatile central couple appear even more defenseless than they really are."

Awards
Chicken & Egg Emergent Narrative Woman Director Award, South by Southwest (2012, won)
Bingham Ray Breakthrough Director Award, Gotham Independent Film Awards (2013, nominated) 
Best Film Not Playing at a Theater Near You, Gotham Independent Film Awards (2013, nominated)

References

External links 
 

2012 films
2012 thriller films
Films set in Florida
American thriller films
Films shot in Florida
American independent films
2012 independent films
2010s English-language films
2010s American films